"Can You Stop the Rain" is a song by American singer Peabo Bryson, taken from his fifteenth studio album of the same name (1991). It was written by John Bettis and Walter Afanasieff, while production was helmed by the latter. Released as the album's lead single, the song spent two weeks at number one on the US Hot R&B/Hip-Hop Songs chart and peaked at number fifty-two on the Billboard Hot 100. It also reached number 11 on the Adult Contemporary chart.

Music video

Directed by Rocky Schenck, the video is shot in a sepia tone with Bryson singing the song in places like a plaza, a ballroom containing a band performing and inside a room where he sings to a window that's pouring rain.

Personnel and credits 

 Peabo Bryson: lead vocals
 Walter Afanasieff: songwriter, producer, arranger, keyboards, drums, percussion, synthesized bass
 John Bettis: songwriter
 Gary Cirimelli: synclavier programming
 Ren Klyce: synclavier programming, synthesizer programming (Akai)
 Claytoven Richardson, Jeanie Tracy, Kitty Beethoven, Melisa Kary, Sandy Griffith: background vocals

Charts

Weekly charts

Year-end charts

See also
List of number-one R&B singles of 1991 (U.S.)

References

1991 singles
Music videos directed by Rocky Schenck
Peabo Bryson songs
Songs with lyrics by John Bettis
1991 songs
Pop ballads
Contemporary R&B ballads
Songs written by Walter Afanasieff
Columbia Records singles
Song recordings produced by Walter Afanasieff
1990s ballads
Soul ballads